Katarina Srebotnik and Åsa Svensson were the defending champions, but none competed this year. 

Barbara Schwartz and Jasmin Wöhr won the title by defeating Anabel Medina Garrigues and Arantxa Parra Santonja 6–1, 6–3 in the final.

Seeds

Draw

Draw

References
 Official results archive (ITF)
 Official results archive (WTA)

Copa Colsanitas Seguros Bolivar - Doubles
2004 Doubles